is a city located in Aichi Prefecture, Japan. , the city had an estimated population of 61,503 in 24,352 households, and a population density of 2,854 persons per km2. Nagakute is a member of the World Health Organization’s Alliance for Healthy Cities (AFHC).

Geography

Nagakute is located in the Owari Hills of central Aichi Prefecture, at an elevation of 43 to 184 meters, and is bordered by the metropolis of Nagoya to the west. Thirteen rivers flow through the city.

Climate
The city has a climate characterized by hot and humid summers, and relatively mild winters (Köppen climate classification Cfa).  The average annual temperature in Nagakute is 15.5 °C. The average annual rainfall is 1641 mm with September as the wettest month. The temperatures are highest on average in August, at around 27.9 °C, and lowest in January, at around 4.0 °C.

Demographics
Per Japanese census data, the population of Nagakute has increased dramatically over the past 50 years.

Neighboring municipalities
Aichi Prefecture
Nagoya  (Moriyama-ku, Meitō-ku)
Toyota
Seto
Nisshin
Owariasahi

History

Middle Ages
During the Sengoku period, the Battle of Komaki and Nagakute was held in this vicinity.

Early modern period
During the Edo period area of modern Nagakute was part of the holdings of Owari Domain.

Late modern period
Nagakute Village was established within Aichi District on May 10, 1906 through the merger of the hamlets of Nagakute (different spelling as ), Kamigō and Yazako.

Contemporary history
Nagakute was elevated to town status on April 1, 1971.

Expo 2005 was a major boost to the local economy, and led to the construction of the Linimo, a commercial linear motor train, to connect the area with the Nagoya metropolis.

Nagakute was elevated to city status on January 4, 2012.

Government

Nagakute has a mayor-council form of government with a directly elected mayor and a unicameral city legislature of 18 members. 
The city contributes one member to the Aichi Prefectural Assembly. 
In terms of national politics, the city is part of Aichi District 7 of the lower house of the Diet of Japan.

External relations

Twin towns – Sister cities

International
Sister cities
Waterloo（Walloon Brabant, Belgium）
since October 8, 1992

National
Friendship city
Nagiso（Nagano Prefecture, Chūbu region）
since October 21, 2006
Takarazuka（Hyōgo Prefecture, Kansai region）
since October 27, 2012

Economy

Secondary sector of the economy

Manufacturing
Due to its location, Nagakute's economy is centered around the automobile industry.
Toyota Central R&D Labs., Inc. is located in the city,  as is electrical systems manufacturer Nitto Kogyo.
Nagakute is also the head office of the Aichi Rapid Transit Co., Ltd., better known as the operator of the Linimo Maglev High Speed Surface Transport.

Education

University

 Aichi Prefectural University
 Aichi Prefectural University of Fine Arts and Music
 Aichi Medical University
 Aichi Shukutoku University

Primary education
Nagakute has six public elementary schools and three public junior high schools operated by the city government, and one public high school operated by the Aichi Prefectural Board of Education. There is also one private high school.

International Schools
International Christian Academy of Nagoya (closed)

Transportation

Railways

Conventional lines
Linimo
Tōbu Kyūryō Line：-  –  –  –  –  –  -

Buses 
 The Meitetsu Bus, which serves Nagakute and the surrounding municipalities, operates the  within the city limits.

Roads

Expressways
The , which is designated as a Regional High-Standard Highway, starts from Nagakute and funnels traffic in to the Tōmei Expressway, which passes through Nagakute has no interchange within city limits. However, the Nagoya Interchange, which serves the Tomei and Mei-Nikan Expressways, is close to city limits.

Local attractions
Toyota Automobile Museum
Meito Art Museum
Expo 2005 Site
Site of the Battle of Komaki and Nagakute
Ghibli Park

Notable people from Nagakute 
 Shinta Fukushima, professional soccer player
 Mine Kawakami, pianist

References

External links

  

 
Cities in Aichi Prefecture